The Winchester Model 1897, also known as the Model 97, M97, or Trench Gun, is a pump-action shotgun with an external hammer and tube magazine manufactured by the Winchester Repeating Arms Company. The Model 1897 was an evolution of the Winchester Model 1893 designed by John Browning. From 1897 until 1957, over one million of these shotguns were produced. The Model 1897 was offered in numerous barrel lengths and grades, chambered in 12 and 16 gauge, and as a solid frame or takedown. The 16-gauge guns had a standard barrel length of 28 inches, while 12-gauge guns were furnished with 30-inch length barrels. Special length barrels could be ordered in lengths as short as 20 inches, and as long as 36 inches. Since the time the Model 1897 was first manufactured it has been used by American soldiers, police departments, and hunters.

History
The Winchester Model 1897 was designed by American firearms inventor John Moses Browning. The Model 1897 was first listed for sale in the November 1897 Winchester catalog as a 12 gauge solid frame. The 12 gauge takedown was added in October 1898, and the 16 gauge takedown in February 1900. Originally produced as a tougher, stronger and more improved version of the Winchester 1893, itself an improvement on the early Spencer pump gun, the 1897 was identical to its forerunner, except that the receiver was thicker and allowed for use of smokeless powder shells, which were not common at the time.  The 1897 introduced a "take down" design, where the barrel and magazine tube could easily be separated from the receiver for cleaning or transportation, the ease of removal of the barrel becoming a standard in pump shotguns made today, like the Remington 870 and Mossberg 500 series. Over time, "the model 97 became the most popular shotgun on the American market and established a standard of performance by which other kinds and makes of shotguns were judged, including the most expensive imported articles". The Winchester Model 1897 was in production from 1897 until 1957. It was in this time frame that the "modern" hammerless designs became common, like the Winchester Model 1912 and the Remington 870. The Model 1897 was superseded by the Winchester Model 1912. However, the gun can still be found today in regular use.

Improvements from the 1893
While designing the new Model 1897, many of the weaknesses present in the earlier Model 1893 were taken into account and remedied. These improvements included:

 The frame was strengthened and made longer to handle a 12 gauge -inch shell, as well as the -inch shell.
 The top of the frame was covered so that the ejection of the fired shell was entirely from the side. This added a lot of strength to the frame of the gun and it allowed the use of a  inch shell without the danger of the gun constantly jamming.
 The action could not be opened until a slight forward movement of the slide handle released the action slide lock. In firing, the recoil of the shotgun gave a slight forward motion to the slide handle and released the action slide lock which enabled the immediate opening of the action. In the absence of any recoil, the slide handle had to be pushed forward manually in order to release the action slide lock.
 A movable cartridge guide was placed on the right side of the carrier block to prevent the escape of the shell when the shotgun was turned sideways in the act of loading.
 The stock was made longer and with less drop.

Of these improvements, the slide lock is the one that made the Model 1897 into a safe firearm. This improved slide lock kept the shotgun locked until actual firing occurred which prevented it from jamming in the case of a misfire. The slide lock "stands in such a relation to the body of the firing pin as will prevent the firing pin reaching the primer until the pin has moved forward a sufficient distance to insure locking of the breech bolt". This prevents the action sleeve "from being retracted by the hand of the gunner until after firing, and hence rendering the firearm more safe".

Description

The Winchester Model 1897 and the Winchester Model 1893 were both designed by John Browning. The Model 1897 is an external hammer shotgun lacking a trigger disconnector. This means that the user can hold the trigger down while cycling the shotgun and once the action is returned to battery the shotgun fires. The firearm itself is classified as a slide action pump shotgun. It was the first truly successful pump-action shotgun produced. Throughout the time period the Model 1897 was in production, over a million of the type were produced in various grades and barrel lengths. 16-gauge guns had a standard barrel length of 28 inches, while 12-gauge guns were furnished with 30-inch length barrels. Special length barrels could be ordered in lengths as short as 20 inches, and as long as 36 inches. Along with various grades and barrel lengths, the Model 1897 came in two different chamberings. One was the 12 gauge and the other was the 16 gauge. The shells should be of the  inch or  inch model. Any shells larger are not recommended. An average Model 1897 can hold 6 shotgun shells in the magazine tube. When working the action of the Model 1897 the forend (fore grip) is pulled back, forcing the breech bolt to the rear which extracts and then ejects the spent shell while simultaneously cocking the external hammer by pushing it to the rear. When the forend is slid forward again, the breech bolt pushes a fresh shell into the gun's chamber and locks into place.

The Chinese company Norinco has made an effort to reproduce this firearm. The Norinco 97 is an almost exact copy of the Winchester 1897, produced in both Trench and Riot grades, yet lacking in the fit and finish of the originals.

Grades of the Model 97

Original prices
When the Model 1897 was first introduced, the price depended upon what grade was being purchased and what features were being added to that specific shotgun. To purchase a plain finished shotgun would cost the buyer $25, whereas an engraved receiver with checkered and finer wood included cost $100. The more expensive grades of the Model 1897 were the standard, trap, pigeon, and tournament grades. These were the grades that were normally equipped with an engraved receiver and with checkered, finer wood. The less expensive and plainer grades were the Brush, Brush Takedown, Riot, and Trench. These grades were not given the higher valued wood or special designs. This is because these guns were designed and built for hard abuse. These grades stood a higher chance of being badly damaged so there was no need to put extra money into them for appearance purposes. As the functions that were performed with these grades required them to be lightweight, it was not beneficial to use heavy and expensive wood when designing them. Most often, when these grades were purchased, they were purchased in high numbers. By designing these grades with standard wood and finish, it kept the prices at a lower level. They were also sold in German catalogues for prices comparable to luxury double-barreled shotguns.

Military use

The Model 1897 was issued to American soldiers during the Philippine–American War of 1899. This first major use of issued shotguns by the United States military involved 200 weapons procured and sent to the Philippines in 1900. They were employed in countering Moro tribesmen who engaged the Americans in close-quarter combat using knives and swords. (See: juramentado)

During the Punitive Expedition in Mexico, some US soldiers were also equipped with M97s. Already popular before World War I, sales of the Model 1897 picked up after the war broke. This was because many were produced to meet the demands of the military. When the United States entered World War I, there was a need for more service weapons to be issued to the troops. It became clear to the United States just how brutal trench warfare was, and how great the need was for a large amount of close-range firepower while fighting in a trench, after they had observed the war for the first three years. The Model 1897 Trench grade was an evolution of this idea. The pre-existing Winchester Model 1897 was modified by adding a perforated steel heat shield over the barrel which kept the soldier's hands off a hot barrel, and an adapter with bayonet lug for affixing an M1917 bayonet.

This model was ideal for close combat and was efficient in trench warfare due to its 20-inch cylinder bore barrel. Buckshot ammunition was issued with the trench grade during the war. Each round of this ammunition contained nine 00 (.33-caliber) buckshot pellets. This gave considerable firepower to the individual soldier by each round that was fired. This shorter barrel and large amount of firepower is what made this grade ideal for trench warfare.

It has been said that American soldiers who were skilled at trap shooting were armed with these guns and stationed where they could fire at enemy hand grenades in midair.

Unlike most modern pump-action shotguns, the Winchester Model 1897 (versions of which were type classified as the Model 97 or M97 for short) fired each time the action closed with the trigger depressed (that is, it lacks a trigger disconnector). Coupled with its five-shot capacity, this made it effective for close combat, such that troops referred to it as a "trench sweeper". This characteristic allowed troops to fire the whole magazine with great speed. The Model 1897 was so effective, and feared, that the German government protested (in vain) to have it outlawed in combat. The Model 1897 was used again in World War II by the United States Army and Marine Corps, where it was used alongside the similarly militarized version of the hammerless Model 1912. Some were still in service during the Korean War and the Vietnam War.

Other military uses of the shotgun included "the execution of security/interior guard operations, rear area security operations, guarding prisoners of war, raids, ambushes, military operations in urban terrain, and selected special operations". Despite protesting them, Germans did not listen to Ludendorff and decided to use and unofficially adopt the M1897 for their own use with modifications and named it "trench mauser" and mainly place them with stormtroopers.

World War I protests
Although the Model 1897 was popular with American troops in World War I, the Germans soon began to protest its use in combat. "On 19 September 1918, the German government issued a diplomatic protest against the American use of shotguns, alleging that the shotgun was prohibited by the law of war." A part of the German protest read that "[i]t is especially forbidden to employ arms, projections, or materials calculated to cause unnecessary suffering" as defined in the 1907 Hague Convention on Land Warfare. This is the only known occasion in which the legality of actual combat use of the shotgun has been raised. However, the United States interpreted its use of the shotgun differently than Germany. The Judge Advocate General of the Army, Secretary of State Robert Lansing, carefully considered and reviewed the applicable law and promptly rejected the German protest. France and Britain had double-barreled shotguns available for use as trench warfare weapons during World War I; however, unable to obtain high-powered ammunition and judging reload speed too slow for close combat, these countries did not field them.

The rejection of their protest greatly upset the German forces, because they believed they were treated unjustly in the war. Shortly after the protest was rejected, Germany issued threats that they would punish all captured American soldiers that were found to be armed with a shotgun. This led to the United States issuing a retaliation threat, stating that any measures unjustly taken against captured American soldiers would lead to reprisals by the United States on captured German troops who wielded flamethrowers and serrated bayonets. However, Tom Laemlein, in his article entitled The Trouble with Trench Guns noted that "there are no photos [online or not] of trench guns in combat [during World War I]. None." He believed that in spite of retaliation threats, the American Expeditionary Forces (AEF) ordered that photos of trench guns in combat be censored, and ultimately eliminated to prevent leaking among the press that would give Germany a reason to portray U.S. troops as "undisciplined and barbaric" and "incapable of using proper rifles." Another reason is that there were also seemingly concerns by General John J. Pershing and his staff that French and British commanders might exert control of American forces over public relations with the combat use of trench guns, as America was considered a junior partner among the Entente Powers. Laemlein concluded that "[t]he trench guns would remain in France and continue to do their deadly, effective work, but there would simply be no photographs allowed to document it."

Other uses
After the war, a shorter-barrelled version of the Model 1897 was marketed by Winchester as a riot gun. Messengers of The American Express Company were armed with this weapon as were various police departments throughout the US.  The differences between this riot version and the trench version were that the riot version lacked the heat shield and bayonet lug, and all trench guns were equipped with sling swivels, whereas most riot guns were not.

Users
 
 : used by UDT/SEAL

See also
 List of individual weapons of the U.S. Armed Forces
 List of shotguns

Citations

General and cited references

External links
 Olive-Drab: Winchester Model 97 Shotgun

Firearms by John Browning
Police weapons
Pump-action shotguns
Shotguns of the United States
United States Marine Corps equipment
Weapons of the Philippine Army
Winchester Repeating Arms Company firearms
World War I infantry weapons of the United States
World War II firearms of the United States